Federico Sebastián Viñas Barboza (born 30 June 1998) is a Uruguayan professional footballer who plays as a forward for Liga MX club América.

Club career

Juventud de Las Piedras
Viñas began his career with Juventud in his native Uruguay.

Loan to Club America
On 29 August 2019, Viñas joined Mexican side Club América on a one-year loan agreement with the option for a permanent deal. He made his Liga MX debut on 14 September against Universidad Nacional. He entered the match as a 77th minute substitute and scored 28 seconds later to break the scoreless deadlock. Viñas appeared in eleven matches during the Apertura tournament, managing to score five goals, three of which were scored in the championship stage; he scored one goal against Tigres UANL in the second leg of the quarterfinals, against Monarcas Morelia in the second leg of the semifinals, and once more in the second leg of the championship match against Monterrey at the Estadio Azteca.

Club America
On 30 May 2020, it was announced that America had exercised their $1.9 million option to sign Viñas on a five-year contract, with the loan move becoming permanent on 1 July.

International career

Uruguay U-23
Viñas was included in Uruguay's U23 squad for the 2020 CONMEBOL Pre-Olympic Tournament. On 25 January 2020, Viñas scored his first goal with his national team in a 3–2 defeat against Bolivia U23.

Career statistics

Club

Honours
Individual
CONCACAF Champions League Best Young Player: 2021
CONCACAF Champions League Team of the Tournament: 2021

References

1998 births
Living people
Uruguayan footballers
Uruguayan expatriate footballers
Juventud de Las Piedras players
Club América footballers
Uruguayan Primera División players
Uruguayan Segunda División players
Liga MX players
Expatriate footballers in Mexico
Association football forwards
Footballers from Montevideo